Kalam festival, Kalam mela or Swat summer festival is a cultural and recreational event, held every year in the month of July or August in the scenic valley of Kalam and Mahodand, 100 kilometers from the city of Swat, in Pakistan. The festival is arranged in the pattern of Shandur Polo festival. The days, when plain areas of Pakistan are hot and humid, tourists are enjoying cold weather in Kalam and the tent village; Mahudand. The festival is organized by the Khyber Pakhtunkhwa Tourism Department in collaboration with the Pakistan Army. Sports, cultural and recreational activities are arranged during the week.

Background 
To promote tourism and celebrate restoration of peace in Swat after three years of militancy (2007-2009), the first summer festival was organized in 2010 by the joint venture of Pakistan Army and Swat Hotels Association in collaboration with the Provincial Reconstruction, Rehabilitation and Resettlement Authority (PaRRSA). Since then, the festival is organized regularly in the months of July or August.

Activities at the festival 

To provide recreation to the participants, multiple activities are arranged during the week long festival. Paragliding, handicraft display, Jeep rally, Cycling, Canoeing, Cultural shows., and Music concerts are the glimpses of the festival. Traditional Khattak dance, horse dance, Chitral dance and regional dances are also part of the festival.

Importance of the event 
A large number of tourists from across Pakistan and abroad attend the festival. In 2012, about 0.5 million tourists visited Swat Summer festival. This number has increased in the coming years. Head of State or provincial head are the chief guests in the opening and concluding ceremony. In 2015, Chief Minister of Khyber Pakhtunkhwa Pervez Khattak and Chief of Army Staff (Pakistan);General Raheel Sharif attended the festival.

References 

Tourist attractions in Khyber Pakhtunkhwa
Festivals in Pakistan by province
Festivals in Pakistan